Franz Immig (10 September 1918 – 26 December 1955) was a footballer who played international football for both Germany and Saarland. Born in Sondernheim, Immig played for Karlsruher FV, Stuttgarter Kickers and 1. FC Saarbrücken.

References

External links

1918 births
1955 deaths
Saar footballers
German footballers
Germany international footballers
Saarland international footballers
Dual internationalists (football)
1. FC Saarbrücken players
Stuttgarter Kickers players
Karlsruher FV players
Association football defenders
People from Germersheim
Footballers from Rhineland-Palatinate